Kusursuz 19 (The Perfect 19) is the fourth studio album by Turkish singer Demet Akalın, released in June 2006. It was produced by Seyhan Müzik. Ersay Üner served as the album's music director, while Erhan Bayrak and Mustafa Ceceli both arranged the majority of the album's songs.

Achievements
The album sold 147,000 copies, got a gold certification from Mü-Yap, and its lead single "Afedersin" became a number-one hit on Türkçe Top 20. Separate music videos were also made for the songs "Herkes Hakettiği Gibi Yaşıyor", "Mantık Evliliği" and "Alçak". Akalın received the award for Best Female Artist at the 13th Turkey Music Awards and "Afedersin" was chosen as the Best Song of the Year.

Track listing

Personnel

Music

Production 
 Executive producers: Bülent Seyhan, Ersay Üner, Demet Akalın,
 Production: Bülent Seyhan, Ersay Üner, Demet Akalın
 Mastering: Ulaş Ağce
 Audio engineering: Arzu Arısoy, Serdar Ağırlı, Serkan Kula, DJ Özhan Özal

Visuals 
 Artwork, photographs: Emre Ünal
 Make-up: Audisho Audisho
 Design: Audisho Audisho

Credits adapted from Discogs.

Charts

Sales

References 

Demet Akalın albums
2006 albums